Lake Sanborn is a lake in Le Sueur County, in the U.S. state of Minnesota.

Lake Sanborn was named for Edwin Sanborn, a pioneer who settled there in 1857.

See also
List of lakes in Minnesota

References

Lakes of Minnesota
Lakes of Le Sueur County, Minnesota